12th Visual Effects Society Awards
February 12, 2014

Best Visual Effects in a Visual Effects Driven Motion Picture:
Gravity

The 12th Visual Effects Society Awards was held in Los Angeles at the Beverly Hilton Hotel on February 12, 2014, in honor to the best visual effects in film and television of 2013. Patton Oswalt was the host.

Winners and nominees
(winners in bold)

Honorary Awards
Lifetime Achievement Award:
John Dykstra
VES Visionary Award:
Alfonso Cuarón

Film

Television

Other categories

References

External links
Visual Effects Society
 Visual Effects Society Awards 2013 at Internet Movie Database

2013
Visual Effects Society Awards
Visual Effects Society Awards
Visual Effects Society Awards
Visual Effects Society Awards